In classical drama, the epitasis is the main action of a play, in which the trials and tribulations of the main character increase and build toward a climax and dénouement. It is the third and central part when a play is analyzed into five separate parts: prologue, protasis, epitasis, catastasis and catastrophe.

In modern dramatic theory, the dramatic arc is often referred to, which uses somewhat different divisions but is substantially the same concept overall.

Drama
Ancient Greek theatre